Mississippi Highway 577 (MS 577) was a short highway in southern Mississippi. It started at the Louisiana state line and traveled northwest. The route ended at MS 48, east of Tylertown. MS 577 was designated in 1957, and was removed from the state highway system ten years later.

Route description
As of 1965, all of the route was in Walthall County. The route started at the Louisiana state line, where Louisiana Highway 62 (LA 62) ended. MS 577 quickly turned northwest on Old State Line Road. The route continued to travel in the same direction until it reached Old Settlement Road, where it bent westward, then northward. MS 577 then turned north onto Dexter Road, and continued to shift west. MS 577 is maintained by the Mississippi State Highway Commission, as part of the state highway system.

History
The road that became MS 577 first appeared on maps in 1956. Less than half of it was paved. The designation appeared two year later. By 1967, the route was removed from the state highway system.

Major intersections

References

External links

577
Transportation in Walthall County, Mississippi